Harrison may refer to:

People 
 Harrison (name)
 Harrison family of Virginia, United States

Places 

In Australia:
 Harrison, Australian Capital Territory, suburb in the Canberra district of Gungahlin

In Canada:
 Inukjuak, Quebec, or "Port Harrison", Nunavik region of northern Quebec, Canada
 Harrison Lake, a lake in the Lower Mainland region of British Columbia, Canada
 Harrison Hot Springs, resort village in British Columbia, Canada, located on Harrison Lake
 Harrison River, a tributary of the Fraser River and which is the outlet of Harrison Lake
 Harrison Bay (British Columbia), a side water of the river
 Harrison Mills, British Columbia, a locality and former mill town at the mouth of the Harrison River
 Harrison Knob, a prominent hill and important archaeological site adjacent to the mouth of the Harrison River
 Harrison Island (Nunavut), Hudson Bay, Nunavut
 Harrison Islands, Gulf of Boothia, Nunavut
 Harrison Settlement, Nova Scotia
In the Philippines:
 Harrison Avenue, a main road in Pasay, Metro Manila
 Harrison Plaza, a shopping mall in the City of Manila
In the United States:
 Harrison, Arkansas
 Harrison, Georgia
 Harrison, Idaho
 Harrison, Illinois (disambiguation)
 Harrison, Vigo County, Indiana
 Harrison, Maine 
 Harrison, Michigan
 Harrison, Minneapolis, Minnesota
 Harrison, Montana
 Harrison, Nebraska
 Harrison, New Jersey
 Harrison, New York
 Harrison, Ohio
 Harrison, Roanoke, Virginia
 Harrison, South Dakota
 Harrison, Tennessee 
 Harrison, Wisconsin (disambiguation)
 Harrisonburg, Louisiana
 Harrisonburg, Virginia

Transportation
 Harrison (automobile), a 1900s American automobile company
 Harrison (Metro-North station) in New York
 Harrison station (CTA) in Chicago, Illinois
 Harrison station (NJT) in New Jersey
 Harrison station (PATH) in New Jersey

See also 
 Harison (disambiguation)
 Harrison Audio Consoles, maker of broadcast and recording audio equipment, DAWs, and cross-platform plugins.
 Harrison Apartment Building, listed on the National Register of Historic Places in Washington, D.C.
 Harrison College (Indiana) (formerly Indiana Business College)
 Harrison Narcotics Tax Act
 George Harrison (album)
 Harrison & Harrison organ builders
 Harrison and Sons postage stamp printers
 Harrison's Principles of Internal Medicine
 Harrison Bergeron, short story by Kurt Vonnegut
 Justice Harrison (disambiguation)